Martin John Sheridan (March 28, 1881 – March 27, 1918) was a three time Olympic Games gold medallist. He was born in Bohola, County Mayo, Ireland, and died in St. Vincent's Hospital in Manhattan, New York, the day before his 37th birthday, a very early casualty of the 1918 flu pandemic. He is buried in Calvary Cemetery, Queens, New York. He was part of a group of Irish-American athletes known as the "Irish Whales".

Career
At 6 ft 3 in (191 cm) and 194 lbs (88 kg), Sheridan was the best all-around athlete of the Irish American Athletic Club, and like many of his team mates, served with the New York City Police Department (from 1906 until his death in 1918).  Sheridan was so well respected in the NYPD, that he served as the Governor's personal bodyguard when the governor was in New York City.

A five-time Olympic gold medalist, with a total of nine Olympic medals, Sheridan was called "one of the greatest figures that ever represented this country in international sport, as well as being one of the most popular who ever attained the championship honor." He won the discus throw event at the 1904, 1906, and 1908 Summer Olympics as well as the shot put at the 1906 Olympics and the Greek discus in 1908. At the 1906 Intercalated Games in Athens he also won silver medals in the standing high jump, standing long jump and the stone throw.

In 1907, Sheridan won the National Amateur Athletic Union discus championship and the Canadian championship, and in 1908 he won the Metropolitan, National and Canadian championships as well as two gold medals in the discus throw and bronze in the standing long jump at the 1908 Olympic Games.

Two of Martin Sheridan's gold medals from the 1904 Olympic Games in St. Louis, Missouri and one of his medals from the 1906 Olympic Games in Athens, Greece, are currently located in the USA Track & Field's Hall of Fame History Gallery, in Washington Heights, Manhattan.

Legacy
It is often claimed that Sheridan fueled a controversy in London in 1908, when flagbearer Ralph Rose refused to dip the flag to King Edward VII.  Sheridan is supposed to have supported Rose by explaining "This flag dips to no earthly king," and it is claimed that his statement exemplified both Irish and American defiance of the British monarchy. However, careful research has shown that this was first reported in 1952. Sheridan himself made no mention of it in his published reports on the Games and neither did his obituary.

The inscription on the granite Celtic Cross monument marking Martin Sheridan's grave in Calvary Cemetery, Queens, New York says in part: "Devoted to the Institutions of his Country, and the Ideals and Aspirations of his Race. Athlete. Patriot."

According to his obituary in the New York Times, Sheridan was "one of the greatest athletes the United States has ever known".

Notes

References

 
 
 http://www.wingedfist.com/assets/Sheridan_from_Sprin_3100.pdf Police Athletes of the Past: Martin Sheridan - Spring 3100

External links
 
New York Times obituary

1881 births
1918 deaths
Sportspeople from County Mayo
American Roman Catholics
American male shot putters
American male discus throwers
American male high jumpers
American male long jumpers
Olympic gold medalists for the United States in track and field
Olympic bronze medalists for the United States in track and field
Athletes (track and field) at the 1904 Summer Olympics
Athletes (track and field) at the 1906 Intercalated Games
Athletes (track and field) at the 1908 Summer Olympics
Irish emigrants to the United States (before 1923)
New York City Police Department officers
Burials at Calvary Cemetery (Queens)
Deaths from the Spanish flu pandemic in New York (state)
Medalists at the 1908 Summer Olympics
Medalists at the 1904 Summer Olympics
Medalists at the 1906 Intercalated Games
Track and field athletes from New York City